Kings Weir is a weir on the River Lea near Turnford and Nazeing in Hertfordshire, England.

Ecology
It is a well known fishery where barbel can be caught.

Access
Pedestrian and cycle access from the Lee Valley Walk. Vehicular access at Wormley.

References

External links 
 Kings Weir - a history

Weirs on the River Lea
Geography of Essex